Lobsang Yeshe (also written Lobsang Yeshi) (1663–1737) was the fifth Panchen Lama of Tibet.

He was born of a well-known and noble family in the province of Tsang. His father's name was De-chhen-gyalpo and his mother's Serab-Drolma. He was soon recognised as the true incarnation of Lobsang Chökyi Gyaltsen, (1570–1662), the Fourth Panchen Lama of Tibet, and was installed with great ceremony at Tashilhunpo Monastery.

He received novice vows when he was 8 (9 by Western reckoning) in Lhasa from Lozang Gyatso, the Great Fifth Dalai Lama (1617 – 1682), when he was given the name of Lobsang Yeshe. At the age of twenty [21] he was ordained by Kon-chhog Gyal-tsan.

When he was thirty-two (in 1696 or 1697), he sent a congratulatory deputation to Beijing. The Kangxi Emperor (1662-1723) invited him to Beijing, but he asked to be excused for fear of smallpox.

The Regent, Sangye Gyatso (Sangs-rgyas rgya-mtsho), invited the Fifth Panchen Lama, Lobsang Yeshi to administer the vows of a novice monk on the 6th Dalai Lama, at the town of Nangartse on Lake Yamdrok Yamtso, and named him Tsang Gyatso. In October 1697, Tsangyang Gyatso was enthroned as the Sixth Dalai Lama.

In 1701, Lhasang Khan, a Mongol king and ally of the Chinese, had the Regent, Sangye Gyatso, killed. This greatly upset the young Dalai Lama who left his studies who even visited Lobsang Yeshe, the 5th Panchen Lama in Shigatse and renounced his novice monk vows.

In 1713, he received a letter written in three different languages, Tibetan, Mongol and Manchu in gold from the Kangxi Emperor, who sent him a large tangka with his title on it.

The 7th Dalai Lama was enthroned in the Potala Palace in 1720. He took the novice vows of monk-hood from the 5th Panchen Lama Lobsang Yeshi, who gave him the name Kelzang Gyatso. He took the Gelong vows (full ordination) from Lobsang Yeshi in 1726.

In 1728, the Yongzheng Emperor (1723-1736) sent Aliha Ampan to settle the border between the provinces of U and Tsang. There was a civil war at this time, and the Chinese asked the Panchen Lama if he would rule all the territories between Khambala and Mount Kailash. The Panchen Lama refused a few times on the grounds of old age but was finally convinced to take control of the whole of Tibet lying to the west of Panam, and relinquished possession of Phari, Gyantse, and Yardosho and other places to the government in Lhasa.

He wrote eighteen volumes of hymns and precepts and died at the age of 75 (74 by Western reckoning), in 1737.

A gilt copper domed tomb, like that of his predecessor, only larger was built for him. Unfortunately, all the tombs from the Fifth to the Ninth Panchen Lamas were destroyed during the Cultural Revolution and have been replaced by the 10th Panchen Lama with a huge tomb at Tashilhunpo Monastery in Shigatse, known as the Tashi Langyar.

References 

1663 births
1737 deaths
Panchen Lama 05
17th-century Tibetan people
18th-century Tibetan people
17th-century lamas
18th-century lamas